Thikri is a town and a tehsil in Barwani District, Madhya Pradesh, India.

Geography
Thikri is a small city located  around 16 km north-east of Julwania. Surrounded by Khargone, Barwani and Barwaha , the town is a part of Barwani District and the Indore region. It is also near the river Narmada.

Climate

References

External links
 Satellite map of Thikri
 About Thikri
 Wikimapia

Cities and towns in Barwani district